Carla Eduarda Tiene (born 15 May 1981 in Rio Claro) is a Brazilian former tennis player.

Tiene was born in Rio Claro and resides in São Carlos. Her career-high singles ranking is No. 256, achieved on 22 April 2002, and her highest doubles ranking is 175, reached on 21 October 2002. Her favourite surface is hardcourt.
  
Tiene played at the 2002 WTA Brasil Open as a wildcard receiver but lost in the first round to Iva Majoli.

Playing for Brazil Fed Cup team, she has a win–loss record of 12–8.

Tiene retired from professional tennis 2010.

ITF Circuit finals

Singles: 18 (8 titles, 10 runner-ups)

Doubles: 59 (36 titles, 23 runner-ups)

Unplayed final

External links
 
 
 Carla Tiene at CoreTennis.net

Brazilian female tennis players
1981 births
Living people
Sportspeople from São Paulo (state)
20th-century Brazilian women
21st-century Brazilian women